Santo Amaro is a district in the subprefecture of the same name in the southern area of the city of São Paulo, Brazil. It was formerly a separate municipality until 1933, when it was incorporated to the municipality of São Paulo.

A German school, Ginasio Humboldt Santo Amaro, was previously in Santo Amaro.

See also
 Roman Catholic Diocese of Santo Amaro

References

External links
 Roman Catholic Diocese of Santo Amaro

1933 disestablishments in Brazil
Former cities
Districts of São Paulo
Populated places disestablished in 1933